Abbadia may refer to:

Abbadia (surname), an Italian surname
Abbadia, Montepulciano, a frazione of Montepulciano, Province of Siena, Tuscany
Abbadia, Siena, a frazione of Siena, Province of Siena, Tuscany
Abbadia a Isola, a frazione of Monteriggioni, Province of Siena, Tuscany
Abbadia Alpina, a frazione of Pinerolo, Province of Turin, Piedmont
Abbadia Cerreto, a municipality in the Province of Lodi, Lombardy
Abbadia Lariana, a municipality in the Province of Lecco, Lombardy
Abbadia San Salvatore, a municipality in the Province of Siena, Tuscany

See also
Abbadie (disambiguation)
Badia (disambiguation)